Wolfgang Neuss (3 December 1923 – 5 May 1989) was a German actor and Kabarett artist. Beginning in the mid-1960s, he also became famous for his political engagement, first for the SPD, then for the extra-parliamentary opposition, APO. He died in 1989 from a longtime cancer.

At the age of 15 he went to Berlin to become a clown but was dismissed. When Germany entered into the Second World War Neuss was drafted, first to the Reich Labour Service where he was occupied with road construction. Later he was sent to the Eastern Front where he became injured and was rewarded with the Iron Cross. It was during his stays in military hospitals and, after the war during military detention that Neuss began to discover his interest in acting and for Kabarett.

Filmography

  (The man in search of himself) (1950)
  (Who drove the grey Ford?) (1950) as Uwe Lauterbach
  (You have to be beautiful) (1951) as Moritat singer
  (1952) as Ballman
  (Mikosch comes in) (1952) as Franzek
  (I lost my heart in Heidelberg) (1952) as Karl
  (You only live once) (1952) as boxer Willy
  (All clues lead to Berlin) (1952) as Martin
  (The uncle from America) (1953) as conferencier
  (We'll talk about love later) (1953) as detective Leonhard Pingel
  (Dutch girl) (1953) as Mr. Zimt
  (Not afraid of big animals) (1953) as magician
  (The empress of China) (1953) as Wonderful
  (No way back) (1953) as comedian
  (Hooray, it's a boy!) (1953)
  (On the Reeperbahn at half past midnight) (1954) as Nigrantz
  (The phantom of the big tent) (1954)
  (The beautiful miller) (1954)
  (The golden plague) (1954)
  (The devil's general) (1955) as police photographer
  (1955)
  (Sacred lie) (1955)
  (Sergeant Borck) (1955) as Krüger
  (I was an ugly girl) (1955) as journalist Mopp
  (Bandits of the Autobahn) (1955) as chansonnier
  (The happy wanderer) (1955) as director Kneppke
  (Operation sleeping bag) (1955) as Hauptmann Z.
  (My Leopold) (1955) as Charly
  (Sky without stars) (1955) as Vopo Edgar Bröse
  (The three from the filling station) (1955) as Prokurist Bügel
  (1955) as Gefreiter Krawutke
  (1956)
  (1956) as police medic
  (1956) as Peter
  (The captain of Köpenick) (1956) as Kallenberg (Director: Helmut Käutner)
  (Without you all is darkness) (1956) as pharmacist
  (1956) as Lemke
  (1956) as Knacker-Karl
  (Charley's aunt) (1956)
  (Tired Theodore) (1957) as director Noll
  (Spring in Berlin) (1957) as bank robberer
  (1957) as Gast
  (The Spessart inn) (1958) as robberer Knoll
  (The green devils of Monte Cassino) (1958) as Neumann
  (1958) as Egon
  (The muzzle) (1958) as Wilhelm Donnerstag
  (The star of Santa Clara) (1958) as Matteo
  (1958) as narrator
  (Here I am, here I stay) (1959) as presenter
  (Nick Knatterton's adventure) (1959) as a butler at Rieselkalk Castle
  (The night before the premiere) (1959) as Gavrilo
  (Roses for the prosecutor) (1959) as Paul
  (1959) as Willibald Pauke
  (1959) as Jakob Wilkins
 Napoleon in New Orleans (1959) (TV film)
  (1960) as "Pulle" Kulka
  (We cellar children) (1960) as Macke Prinz
  (1961) as Gabriel Ernst, Bildhauer
  (The dream of Lieschen Mueller) (1961) as chauffeur
  (1961) (TV series)
 Macky Pancake (1961) (TV series, 3 episodes)
  (1962) as Oskar Puste
  (1963) as Bowlingbahnangestellter Wolfgang
  (Dead woman from Beverly Hills) (1964) as Ben
  (Serenade for two spies) (1965) as secret service chief
  (1966, TV film) as Jones
  (1967) as Pilenz
  (1969, TV film) as Erich Mühsam
  (1974) as Mr. Draeger
  (1983)
  (1984) as Annemarie Renger (final film role)

Cabarett shows 
  (end of 1940s)
  (1951)
  (1959)
  (1959)
  (1963)
  (1965)
  (1967)
  (1967)
  (1968)
  (mid-1980s in WDR)

Other recordings 
  (with Lotte Lenya as Jenny and Wolfgang Neuss as Moritat singer, recorded 11–15 January 1958, Berlin Tempelhof)

See also

References

Further reading
 Bergfelder, Tim & Bock, Hans-Michael. ''The Concise Cinegraph: Encyclopedia of German. Berghahn Books, 2009.

Films 
 "Wolfgang Neuss: Ekstase und Melancholie". Jürgen Miermeister. Production: ZDF, 1993, 23 min.
 "Narrkose – Von und mit Wolfgang Neuss". Rüdiger Daniel and Uschi Sixt-Roessler. First airing 4 December 1993, 43 min. Production: WDR
 "Der Mann mit der Pauke: Wolfgang Neuss". Documentation, book and regie: Jürgen Miermeister. Production: ZDF, first aired: 3 December 1998
 "Neuss Deutschland: Querulant der Republik". Julia Oelkers and Peter Scholl. Documentation, 45 min. Production: rbb, first aired: 4 Dezember 2006 
 "Das Neuss Testament". Rüdiger Daniel. Production dibsfilm and rbb, 2009, movie film, 72 min.

External links
 

1923 births
1989 deaths
German male film actors
Actors from Wrocław
People from the Province of Lower Silesia
20th-century German male actors
Rundfunk im amerikanischen Sektor people
Burials at the Waldfriedhof Zehlendorf
Reich Labour Service members
German Army personnel of World War II
Recipients of the Iron Cross (1939)
German prisoners of war in World War II